Pelangi Kasih School is a private Christian religious primary and secondary school in Jakarta, Indonesia. The main campus is located at Taman Grisenda Blok A1 No.28 Jl. Pantai Indah Kapuk, Kapuk Raya, North Jakarta.

Students are educated for the Cambridge GCE 'O' Level (Cambridge General Certificate of Education Ordinary examination) and the Cambridge IGCSE (International General Certificate of Secondary Education), as well as for the SAT (Scholastic Aptitude Test) and TOEFL (Test Of English as a Foreign Language) examinations.

As a Christian school, its education emphasizes the Gospel and faith in Jesus Christ.

External links 
 

Educational institutions established in 1996
1996 establishments in Indonesia
Schools in Indonesia
National Plus schools
Schools in Jakarta